Andrew Russell is professor of politics at the University of Liverpool, and will take the position of Head of Politics from January 2018. He is a specialist on the British Liberal Democrats party and on young people.

Education
Russell studied politics and history at the University of Loughborough before completing an MA in political behaviour at the University of Essex. He received his a PhD from the University of Sheffield for a thesis on spatial variation in economic attitudes and voting behaviour.

Career
Russell began his career as lecturer in politics at the University of Leeds before moving to the University of Manchester in 1994 where he became a professor in 2011. He is a specialist on the British Liberal Democrats party and on young people. In 2004, he was the academic representative on the Electoral Commission's review of the minimum age of candidature and voting in UK elections. With Steve de Wijze he is the co-editor of the journal Representation.

In 2012, the Political Studies Association awarded Russell the Bernard Crick Prize for Outstanding Teaching.

References 

Year of birth missing (living people)
Living people
Alumni of the University of Essex
Alumni of Loughborough University
Alumni of the University of Sheffield
Academics of the University of Manchester
British political scientists